The Black and White Tour (Blanco y Negro Tour) was the worldwide concert tour by Puerto Rican singer Ricky Martin, in support of his 2006 album MTV Unplugged. The tour visited the Americas and Europe.

About the tour
The show, directed for the stage by Jamie King included Ricky Martin's biggest hits, along with songs from his latest live album MTV Unplugged. The two-hour show was divided into four segments: tribal, romance, revolution and, rave.

The tour kicked off with four nights at the José Miguel Agrelot Coliseum in San Juan on February 9, 2007 and travelled to several countries in South and Central America. The Latin American leg of the Black and White Tour wrapped up in late March in Mexico.

The North American leg started at HP Pavilion at San Jose on April 17, 2007. It took Martin to arenas in 17 cities. Three shows from May 14–16 were cancelled (El Paso, Glendale and Albuquerque), after Martin suffered a lower back sprain during a show in Laredo.

In July 2007, Ricky Martin completed a series of sold-out arena dates in Europe, and announced the dates for a second American leg of his Black and White Tour. After playing in Puerto Rico and Mexico, the US portion of new run kicked off on September 29, 2007 at the Honda Center in Anaheim, and run through October 14, 2007. The last stop included the performance at the Madison Square Garden in New York City. Ricky Martin was also the inaugural act who played at the new Fillmore Miami Beach at the Jackie Gleason Theater on October 10–12, 2007.

Set list
"Video Intro"
"Pégate" (contains excerpts of "Raza de Mil Colores" and "Por Arriba, Por Abajo") 
"This Is Good"
Dance Interlude: "Indonesian Transition"
"Jaleo"/"I Don't Care"/"María" 
Dance Interlude: "Hindu Transition"
"Vuelve"
"Gracias por Pensar en Mi"
"Fuego de Noche, Nieve de Día"
"She's All I Ever Had"  (contains excerpts of "Bella") 
"Rebirth" Video Intro
"Revolución"
"It's Alright"
"Livin' la Vida Loca"
"Somos la Semilla
"Asignatura Pendiente"
"Rave Intro"/"Drop It on Me
"Lola, Lola" / "La Bomba" / "The Cup of Life"
"Tal Vez"
"Tu Recuerdo"

Tour dates

Festivals and other miscellaneous performances
Viña del Mar International Song Festival
Monte-Carlo Sporting Summer Festival
Lucca Summer Festival
Rock in Roma
Coca-Cola Live@MTV

Cancellations and rescheduled shows

Box office score data
 Only 33 out of 78 shows are available.

Record sellouts
On Billboard's Top 25 Tours of the first half of 2007 (between November 15, 2006 and May 15, 2007), Ricky Martin ranked at number 19. The tour grossed $13,124,673, with capacity 273,899 and attendance 250,463. Five shows out of twenty two were sold out. And on Billboard'''s Top 25 Boxscores of the same period, Martin ranked at number 15 with his Coliseo de Puerto Rico concerts which grossed $3,988,207.

Broadcasts and recordings
Shows in Vina del Mar and Buenos Aires were broadcast on national televisions.
Ricky Martin filmed a concert DVD at San Juan, Puerto Rico's José Miguel Agrelot Coliseum, on August 10–11, 2007. Ricky Martin Live: Black and White Tour'' was released on CD, DVD, CD/DVD on November 6, 2007, and on Blu-ray Disc on November 25, 2008.

Personnel

Creative producer – Jose Vega, Joyce Flemming, Veikko Fuhrmann
Director – Carol Dodds
Line producer – Monica Sosa
Executive producer for TV, DVD and CD – Bruno Del Granado
Artist – Ricky Martin
Musical director, electric and acoustic guitars, cuatro, vocals – David Cabrera
Electric and acoustic guitars, mandoline – RJ Ronquillo
Keyboard – Ben Stivers
Percussion – Daniel Lopez
Drums – Waldo Madera
Bass, cello – Phil McCarthur
Background vocals – Carlos David Perez, Jackie Mendez
Trumpet, vocals, percussion – Juan "Cheo" Quinones
Saxophone, guitar, keys – Ron Dziubla
Trombone, percussion, keys – Victor Vasquez
Cuatro in "Tu Recuerdo" – Christian Nieves
Featured artist in "Tu Recuerdo" – La Mari of Chambao
Dance captain, choreographer – Jason Young
Dancers – Micki Duran, Tony Francisco, Reshma Gajjar, Vlada Gorbeneva, Mihran Kirakosyan, Christopher "War" Martinez, Tye Myers
Artistic directors – Dago Gonzales, Jamie King
Lighting and stage designer – Roy Bennett
Tour business manager – Anthony Cardona
Tour director – Veikko Fuhrmann
Tour production director – Chris Lamb
Tour production manager – Vicki Huxel
Road manager – Gabriela Araujo
Tour press coordinator – Rondine Alcalá
Tour ticketing – Puerto Rico – Gladys Martinez, Ruth Colon
Fan club ticketing manager – Jennifer Naranjo
Physical therapists – Aixa Tort, Urs Brand
Capoeira instructor – Eric Marinho
Choreographers – Richmond Talauega, Anthony Talauega, Jamaica Craft
Hindu dance choreography – Yudhisthir Nayak, Patnak Sisters
Tour security – Tulio Souza, Alves Da Costa
Equipment manager – Angel Fernandez
Theatrical stage manager – Jorge Guadalupe
Stage manager – Thomas Kelleher
Monitor engineer – Raaphael Alkins
FOH engineer – Carloz Martinez
RF engineer – Cesar William Benavides
Audio analyst – Monty Carlo
Backline – Dave Pennington, Jeremy Nielsen, Jimmy Robison
Pro-tools and keyboard tech – Jose Merconchini
Lighting engineer, operator – Federico Lafuente
Lighting programmer – Cory Fitzgerald, Peter Aquinde
Video crew chief – Omar Montes
Video – Amanda Welker
Advance site coordinator – John Conk
Head carpenter – Ted Schroeder
Carpenters – Dan Mcnabb, Patrick Harbin, Yader Mena
Head rigger – Ken Mitchell
Rigger – Ricky Acebo
Motor control – Steve Haskins
Pyro – Steve Aleff
Cargo – Rock-it Cargo
Stagging, barriers – All Access
Catering – Chose Alfredo Diaz
Transportation – Jonathan Ruiz
Credentials, passes – Cube Passes
Tour costume designer – Roman Diaz
Head costume construction – Harwood Lee
Costume supervisor – Julia Caugant
Costume assistant – Jade Graham
Head of Wardrobe for Ricky Martin – Rosennett Pagan
Head of Wardrobe for band and dancers – Lana Czajka
Video production and design – Veneno Inc.
Creative director – Dago Gonzales
Producer – Jessica Jimenez
Production manager – Iván Navarro
"Somos la Semilla" director, writer – Justin Lebanowski
Project coordinator – Adriana Madrigal
Research – Ariel De Los Santos
Merchandising – Tribecka Latin, LLC.
Travel agency – Ascot Travel, New York
Booking agency – Chris Dalston
Production managers – Mariauxy Castillo-Vitale, Sasha Yabrain
Technical manager – Victor Lam
Assistant director – Jill Dove
Technical director – Mark Guillingham
Lighting designer for DVD – Allen Branton
Gaffer – David Oakes
Programmer – Felix Peralta
Video engineer – Billy Steinberg
Video operator – Oscar Rodriguez
Camera operators – John Atkinson, Manny Boniolla, David Driscoll, Tom Hildreth, Charlie Huntley, Mike Johnson, Raphy Molinary, Jorge Plana, Mark Whitman, Carlos Zayas
Head of utility – Angel Vasquez
Utility crew – Jerry Encarnacion, Juan Pablo Irrizarry, Jorge Irrizarry, Rene Rodriguez, Efrain Rosado-Mestre, Fernando Rosado, Samuel Salinas, Dustin Stephens, Juan A "Cheeze" Torres
Script supervisor – Coraly Santaliz
DVD costume designer – Carrie Cochran-Cabrera
DVD costume stylist – Ed Coreano
Hair and make-up – Wand Montes, Omar Rodriguez, Jacob Oliveras, Hidalkea Batista, Otto Ramos, Jennifer De Leon, Joel Torres, Yaya
Casting – Kalain Santos

References 

Ricky Martin concert tours
2007 concert tours